The 2010–11 Boise State Broncos men's basketball team represented Boise State University during the 2010–11 NCAA Division I men's basketball season. The Broncos, led by first year head coach Leon Rice, played their home games at Taco Bell Arena and were members of the Western Athletic Conference. They finished the season 22–13, 10–6 in WAC play to finish in second place. They advanced to the championship game of the 2011 WAC men's basketball tournament where they lost to Utah State. They were invited to the College Basketball Invitational where they defeated Austin Peay and Evansville before falling to Oregon in the semifinals.

This was the Broncos' final season in the WAC as they joined the Mountain West Conference effective July 1, 2011.

Roster

Schedule

|-
!colspan=9| Exhibition

|-
!colspan=9| Regular season

|-
!colspan=9| WAC tournament

|-
!colspan=9| College Basketball Invitational

References

Boise State Broncos
Boise State Broncos men's basketball seasons
Boise State
Boise
Boise